Gardner C. Hawkins (February 11, 1846 - December 15, 1913) was a Union Army soldier in the American Civil War who received the U.S. military's highest decoration, the Medal of Honor.

Hawkins was born in Pomfret, Vermont and entered service at Woodstock, Vermont. He was awarded the Medal of Honor, for extraordinary heroism on April 2, 1865, while serving as a First Lieutenant with Company D, 3rd Vermont Infantry Regiment, at Petersburg, Virginia. His Medal of Honor was issued on September 30, 1893.

He was a member of the Ancient and Honorable Artillery Company of Massachusetts.

He died at the age of 67, and was buried at the Lindenwood Cemetery in Stoneham, Massachusetts.

Medal of Honor citation

See also
Third Battle of Petersburg, Virginia
3rd Vermont Volunteer Infantry Regiment
Siege of Petersburg

Notes

References

External links

1846 births
1913 deaths
Burials in Massachusetts
People of Vermont in the American Civil War
Union Army officers
United States Army Medal of Honor recipients
American Civil War recipients of the Medal of Honor
People from Pomfret, Vermont